Alan Carr (born 1976) is an English comedian and television personality

Alan, Allan, Allen Carr may also refer to:
Alan Carr (footballer) (born 1939), Australian footballer for North Melbourne
Alan Carr (politician) (born 1948), Northern Ireland trade unionist
Allan Carr (1937–1999), American film producer and manager
Allen Carr (1934–2006), self-help writer
Allan C. Carr, American politician